The Canton of Lamarche is a former French administrative and electoral grouping of communes in the Vosges département of eastern France and in the region of Lorraine. It was disbanded following the French canton reorganisation which came into effect in March 2015. It consisted of 26 communes, which joined the canton of Darney in 2015. It had 4,543 inhabitants (2012).

One of 9 cantons in the Arrondissement of Neufchâteau, the Canton of Lamarche had its administrative centre at Lamarche.

Composition
The Canton of Lamarche comprised the following 26 communes:

Ainvelle
Blevaincourt
Châtillon-sur-Saône
Damblain
Fouchécourt
Frain
Grignoncourt
Isches
Lamarche 
Les Thons
Lironcourt
Marey
Martigny-les-Bains
Mont-lès-Lamarche
Morizécourt
Robécourt
Rocourt
Romain-aux-Bois
Rozières-sur-Mouzon
Saint-Julien
Senaide
Serocourt
Serécourt
Tignécourt
Tollaincourt
Villotte

References

Lamarche
2015 disestablishments in France
States and territories disestablished in 2015